Abbey Road is a thoroughfare in the borough of Camden and the City of Westminster in Greater London running roughly northwest to southeast through St John's Wood near Lord's Cricket Ground. It is part of the road B507. This road is best known for the Abbey Road Studios and for featuring on the cover of The Beatles' album of the same name, which was released in September 1969.

Location
The north western end of Abbey Road begins in Kilburn at the junction with Quex Road and West End Lane. The road was once a track leading to Kilburn Priory and its associated Abbey Farm and was developed in the beginning of the nineteenth century. It continues south east for roughly one mile crossing Belsize Road, Boundary Road, and Marlborough Place, ending at the junction of Grove End Road and Garden Road.

History
The Abbey National Building Society (now Santander UK) was founded in 1874 as The Abbey Road & St John's Wood Permanent Benefit Building Society in one Baptist Church on Abbey Road.

EMI's Abbey Road Studios is located at the south-western end at 3 Abbey Road, St John's Wood. The Beatles, Kanye West, Glenn Miller, Queen, Radiohead, Lady Gaga, Shirley Bassey, Aretha Franklin, ABBA, Cliff Richard, Kate Bush, Brockhampton, Kylie Minogue, Pink Floyd, and many other famous popular music performers have recorded at this studio. The Beatles named their last studio LP after this street, and the album's cover photograph shows the four group members walking across the zebra crossing just outside the studio entrance.

As a result of its association with the Beatles, this part of Abbey Road has been featured on the London tourism circuit. The crossing was given the official status of Grade II Listed Building by English Heritage in December 2010. The zebra crossing featured on the Beatles cover has become a popular photo opportunity area, despite the road still being a busy thoroughfare for traffic. 

There have been stories about the zebra crossing having been relocated from its original location, but these are ungrounded myths based on the stormwater drain located on the north eastern corner of the crossing, which has been there since the establishment of the sewer system in the City of Westminster.

The Beatles' album cover has been parodied many times over the years. The street sign on the corner of Grove End Road and Abbey Road, which was frequently defaced or stolen, is now mounted high on the building on the corner to save the local council the expense of cleaning and replacing it. The council repaints the wall next to the zebra crossing every three months to cover fans' graffiti.

Abbey Road is also an electoral ward in the City of Westminster. At the 2011 census, it had a population of 11,250.

References

External links

 Abbey Road London, QuickTime VR
 Abbey Road webcam
 Satellite View of Crosswalk / Zebra Crossing
Google Street View of Crosswalk / Zebra crossing
#a79f92 Hex Color - Abbey Road - Color Hex Map

Streets in the City of Westminster
Streets in the London Borough of Camden
Grade II listed buildings in the City of Westminster
English Heritage sites in London
Tourist attractions in the City of Westminster
St John's Wood